Skruda  is a village in the administrative district of Gmina Trojanów, within Garwolin County, Masovian Voivodeship, in east-central Poland.

The village has an approximate population of 90.

References

Skruda